Poikiloderma of Civatte is a cutaneous condition and refers to reticulated red to red-brown skin patches with telangiectasias. It is identifiable as a reddish-brown discoloration on the side of the neck, usually on both sides. It is more common in lighter-skinned individuals, in females rather than in males and more often affects middle-aged to elderly women. 
This disease is basically a change of the skin due to dilation of the blood vessels in the neck. "Civatte" was the French dermatologist who first identified it in the 1920s.

See also 
 Cutis rhomboidalis nuchae
 List of cutaneous conditions
 Poikiloderma
 Poikiloderma vasculare atrophicans

References

External links 

Disturbances of human pigmentation